Etheridgea (minor planet designation: 331 Etheridgea) is a large main belt asteroid. It was discovered by Auguste Charlois on 1 April 1892 in Nice. The meaning of the name is unknown. The orbital plane is tilted at an angle of 6.05° to the plane of the ecliptic.

This result is completely different from the previous rotation period estimates.

References

External links 
 Lightcurve plot of 331 Etheridgea, Palmer Divide Observatory, B. D. Warner (1999)
 Asteroid Lightcurve Database (LCDB), query form (info )
 Dictionary of Minor Planet Names, Google books
 Asteroids and comets rotation curves, CdR – Observatoire de Genève, Raoul Behrend
 Discovery Circumstances: Numbered Minor Planets (1)-(5000) – Minor Planet Center
 
 

000331
Discoveries by Auguste Charlois
Named minor planets
000331
000331
18920401